The World MMA Awards are awards presented by Fighters Only magazine to honor exceptional performance in various aspects of mixed martial arts. Winners are presented with the Fighters Only silver statuette. The World MMA Awards are divided into over twenty categories. The first World MMA Awards ceremony was held in 2008. From their inception to the present, award winners have been chosen through online fan voting. It is the most prestigious award event in the world of MMA.

Active award categories

Fighters

 From 2010, Fighter of the Year was awarded as The Charles 'Mask' Lewis Fighter of the Year in commemoration of Tapout co-founder Charles Lewis Jr.
 From 2010, European Fighter of the Year was awarded as International Fighter of the Year, to the leading MMA fighter from outside of the Americas.

Fight of the Year

Knockout of the Year

Submission of the Year

Comeback of the Year

Upset of the Year

Training, In-ring

 From 2012, Coach of the Year was awarded as The Shawn Tompkins Coach of the Year in commemoration of trainer Shawn Tompkins.

Promotion

Media

 From 2010, Best Media Coverage was awarded as Media Source of the Year.

Special Achievement

Defunct award categories

MMA Clothing & Equipment Brand of the Year 
 2015 Bad Boy
 2016 Venum
 2017 Reebok
 2018 Reebok

Best MMA Brand 
2008 Ultimate Fighting Championship
2009 TapouT

Most Memorable Ring Entrance 
2010  Jason Miller
2011  Jason Miller

Best Lifestyle Clothing Brand 
Best Overall Clothing.
 2008 TapouT
Best MMA Clothing.
 2009 TapouT
Best Lifestyle Clothing Brand.
 2010 TapouT
 2011 TapouT
 2012 Bad Boy
 2013 Bad Boy
 2014 Bad Boy

Best Technical Clothing Brand

Best MMA Shorts. 
 2008 Sprawl
 2009 TapouT

Best Technical Clothing Brand. 
 2010 Bad Boy
 2011 Bad Boy
 2012 Clinch Gear
 2013 Venum
 2014 Venum

Best Technical Equipment 
Best MMA Gloves.
 2008 Fairtex
 2009 UFC / Century
Best Technical Equipment.
 2010 Everlast
 2011 Everlast
 2012 Pretorian
 2013 Bad Boy
 2014 Everlast

References

External links 
 
 2009 Winners
 2010 Winners
 2011 Winners
 2012 Winners
 2013 Winners
 2014 Winners
 2015 Winners
 2016 Winners
 2017 Winners)
 2018 Winners
 2019 Winners

Mixed martial arts
Sports trophies and awards